Rame is a small village approximately three miles west of Penryn and five miles northeast of Helston in Cornwall, England, UK. It is located on the A394 main road.

The tenement of Rame has for generations been in the possession of the Williams family of Scorrier.

References

Hamlets in Cornwall